The 2001 Shell Championship Series was an auto racing series for V8 Supercars. The championship, which was the third Shell Championship Series, began on 25 March 2001 at Phillip Island and ended on 2 December at Sandown after 13 rounds. The same events also determined the winner of the 2001 Australian Touring Car Championship as awarded by the Confederation of Australian Motor Sport.

2001 season

Driver changes
 After racing for the Holden Racing Team since 1994, Craig Lowndes moved to the newly created Ford team formed from the formerly Holden aligned Gibson Motorsport and acquired privateers front runner Rodney Forbes as a teammate. In between his Channel Ten commentary commitments, Neil Crompton joined the team for the enduros.
 Jason Bright replaced Lowndes in the number 2 Holden Racing Team car.
 Rookie Marcos Ambrose and V8 Lites series driver David Besnard joined the series with Stone Brothers Racing. Tony Longhurst found a drive with Rod Nash Racing and joined HRT for the long distance races, while Craig Baird sat idle until the enduros.
 Sacked Gibson Motorsport driver Greg Murphy joined the former Holden Young Lions squad with new sponsor Kmart, he joined Todd Kelly at the team.
 Fellow superseded GMS driver Steven Richards, joined Ford Tickford Racing.
 As part of a franchise deal arrangement the Holden Young Lions identity passed to privateer outfit Romano Racing who ran Paul Romano.
 Cameron McConville joined the re-launched Lansvale Racing Team as a lead driver while owners Steve Reed and Trevor Ashby shared an older VS Commodore.

Team changes
 After running Holden Since 1993 .Gibson Motorsport switched to Ford
 Romano Racing became Holden Young Lions and ran an ex-HRT VT Commodore

Cars
Ford continued with the AU Falcon that the majority of Ford teams ran while some ran the older EL Model. Holden released the new VX Commodore after the VT Commodore. Some Holden teams still ran the VT and some ran the old VS Commodore.

Race formats
 2 45-minute races (around 100 km) will replace the 3 20-minute sprint races. There will also be a compulsory pit stop that has to be taken within a certain time of the race
 There will be a Top 10 or Top 15 Shootout for all rounds during the season that will alternate from round to round. This involves a single lap around the circuit for the Top 10/15 qualifiers in qualifying. The winner of the shootout wins 18 bonus points
 2 events will involve the 3 20-minute sprint races. This will happen at Round 6 and 7 at Barbagello Raceway and Calder Park Raceway. There will be no compulsory pit stops
 At 3 events, there will be 3 races over the weekend, this will happen at Hidden Valley, Pukekoke Park Raceway and Sandown

Special events
Round 2-Clipsal 500 at Adelaide. This involves 2 250 km races over 78 laps of the Adelaide Street circuit. The winner of the event is the driver who wins the second race and not the driver who collects the most points. The second race involves double points over the first race. There are 2 compulsory pit stops in each race, 1 stop for tyres and 1 stop for fuel.

Round 5-GMC 400 at Canberra. This involves 2 100 km races and 1 200 km race over 25 and 50 laps of the Canberra Street Circuit. The winner of the event is the driver who collects the most points over the weekend. The 2nd race of the weekend will involve a reverse grid of the entire field. The 3rd race grid will be a culmination of the points of race 1 and race 2 put together. In the first 2 races there will be only 1 compulsory stop for tyres. In the 3rd race, there will be 1 stop for tyres and 1 stop for fuel.

Round 9-VIP Petfoods Queensland 500 at Queensland Raceway. This is the first of the double driver endurance events. This race is held over 161 laps over 500 km. The race will involve driver changes and fuel and tyre stops will have to happen at the same time.

Round 11-V8 Supercar 1000 at Bathurst. Known as "The Great Race", Bathurst is the event that all the drivers want to win. It is again a double driver event and will involve driver changes at pit stops. The race is held over 161 laps over 1000 km. This season is the first time that the event isn't the last round of the championship.

Television coverage
Channel 10 and Fox Sports broadcast the coverage for the 5th year since 1997 when they took over from Channel 7. Neil Crompton hosted the coverage for regular rounds with Barry Sheene. Bill Woods hosted the coverage at special events while Leigh Diffey hosted the coverage at the last 2 rounds. Matthew White hosted the coverage at Winton for the only time in the 2001 season. Neil Crompton, Barry Sheene and Mark Oastler commentated for most of the season with Leigh Diffey coming in from Queensland 500 onwards. Greg Rust and Grant Denyer were the pit lane reporters after Greg was commentator for the 2000 championship.

Teams and drivers
The following drivers and teams competed in the 2001 Shell Championship Series. The series consisted of 11 rounds of single driver racing and two rounds (the Queensland 500 and the Bathurst 1000) of endurance racing with each car driven by two drivers.

* = Drove in Queensland 500 only

** = Drove in Bathurst 1000 only

Season review

Race calendar
The 2001 Shell Championship Series consisted of 13 rounds which included 7 pit-stop rounds of two or three races, two sprint races, two 2-driver races and 2 1-driver endurance races.

Drivers Championship

Phillip Island, Victoria
Mark Skaife get off to the best start possible as he collects the maximum number of points at Phillip Island with Craig Lowndes second on his debut for Ford thanks to the fastest pit stops over the weekend by his pit crew. Jason Bright comes third on his comeback to the sport.

Adelaide, South Australia
At the next round at Adelaide, Bright wins the round and the double points race after coming from the back of the field after an accident on lap 1, leaving him at the top of the championship. Mark Skaife has a shocker as he came fourth after being spun by Paul Radisich in Race 1 and has another spin in Race 2 leaving him ninth. Craig Lowndes won the Saturday race but tangled with Skaife in Race 2 leaving his car disabled and left him falling behind in the championship. Paul Radisich had the fastest car on the weekend but an axle broke in race 1 and steering damage left him wounded in the championship. Russell Ingall has a good weekend with a third and a second place. There was big controversy over the race officials as rule breaking went unpunished. They were being watched at Eastern Creek.

Eastern Creek, New South Wales
Craig Lowndes and Marcos Ambrose came first and second in the first race but got penalised because of incidents. Craig passed under a Yellow Flag that he could not see and Marcos made an illegal pass on Greg Murphy. This left Greg Murphy 1st on the grid for Race 2 and Mark Skaife second who started tenth in race 1 after he spun in the shootout. Greg Murphy lost his lead to Skaife after he was given a stop-go penalty for jumping the start, but there was more controversy after he didn't come to a complete stop. He got away with it but the rules were changed for the next round. Mark Skaife duly took out the race and round with teammate Jason Bright second but still leading the championship. Greg Murphy came third for the round even with the penalty.

Hidden Valley, Northern Territory
The next round at Hidden Valley turned out to be the car breaker of the year, with Greg Murphy and Russell Ingall having mechanical problems while leading within sight of the flag in Race 3 and 2 respectively. Mark Skaife had a stop-go penalty for jumping the start in Race 1 which left him 12th but still recovered to win Race 3 and come third in the round. Jason Bright had another solid weekend coming second and extending his championship lead over his teammate. But it was Marcos Ambrose who kept his nose clean over the weekend to take the round win in only his fourth championship round.

Canberra, ACT
The GMC 400 was the turning point of the season for Mark Skaife as he came third on the weekend and overtook teammate Jason Bright, who had a difficult weekend. The DJR cars were the cars to have earlier in the weekend as Paul Radisich and Steven Johnson finished 1–2 in qualifying but Radisich spun out in his shootout lap, leaving him 15th and Steven Johnson claiming his first pole position in the series. New for the championship were the pit lane speed limiters restricted to 40 km/h and only one pit bay per team. Steven Johnson wins the first race from Craig Lowndes who was advantaged bt a clear pit lane. Mark Skaife finished 3rd after starting 5th. Marcos Ambrose retires from the race with a broken driveshaft and will start from the back of the grid. The 2nd race is a reverse grid with Steve Reed and Steven Richards starting on the front row. Steven Richards wins from Marcos Ambrose who has a brilliant race which he started from the back but in race 3 he will have to start from the back again. Mark Skaife has a difficult race when he ran into the back of Rodney Forbes in a concertina effect and finished 24th and will start 10th in race 3. The race 3 grid is decided by an aggregate of points accumulated in race 1 and 2 which means that the front row is Craig Lowndes and Paul Radisich. Mark Skaife wins the race with Garth Tander second and Steve Johnson 3rd. Craig Lowndes was leading until a safety car came out with a pit stop still to go. He eventually retired with fuel pressure problems. Steve Johnson won the round with Garth Tander second and Mark Skaife 3rd.

Barbagallo, Western Australia
Paul Radisich dominates the weekend as he wins the shootout and Race 1,2 and 3. Mark Skaife consolidates his championship lead with 2nd in all 3 races with Greg Murphy 3rd on the weekend. Russell Ingall saw his chance of a podium dashed when he jumped the start in Race 3 and finished 4th overall.

Calder Park, Victoria
Paul Morris won his first ever V8 Supercar event as the Big Kev Racer was on the pace from the start of the weekend. Mark Skaife started on Pole but a poor start left him vulnerable to Steven Johnson, who he tapped to give him the lead, but he was issued with a stop-go penalty giving Johnson the lead he never relinquished. Paul Morris came 2nd and Marcos Ambrose 3rd. Paul Morris reverted to blocking in the final 2 races to win both, Russell Ingall finished 2nd in race 2 with Jason Bright 3rd and in race 3, Paul Radisich finished 2nd with Russell Ingall 3rd. Overall for the weekend, Steven Johnson finished 2nd with Russell Ingall 3rd. Mark Skaife finished 14th overall after a spin in race 3.

Oran Park, New South Wales
Mark Skaife comes back from a difficult Calder with a win in both races after starting 2nd. Craig Lowndes claims the pole, but finished 2nd in race 1 and 8th in race 2 after a spin by Garth Tander but still finishes 3rd overall. David Besnard has a fantastic round as he finishes 3rd and 2nd for a 2nd overall as teammate Marcos Ambrose struggles to get to grips with the track.

Queensland 500, Queensland
The 1st 2 driver Enduro threw up plenty of thrills and spills and a dramatic ending. The heavens opened causing a huge thunderstorm as Steven Johnson and Paul Radisich won the race in the gravel trap but was lucky as the red flag came out, putting the result to the previous lap. Russell Ingall and Larry Perkins finish 2nd and Todd Kelly and Greg Murphy 3rd. Mark Skaife and Jason Bright finish 4th even though they had oil on the screen for some of the race.

Winton, Victoria
Russell Ingall put his championship fight another step further as he takes his first round win of the season and also claims his first pole position of his career. Greg Murphy wins Race 1 but a slow pit-stop in Race 2 puts him 6th but still finished 2nd overall for the weekend. Mark Skaife finished 3rd overall for the weekend after starting 15th after a horror qualifying.
Marcos Ambrose was the fastest ford over the weekend as he passed car after car after he ran off-road on the first corner.

V8 Supercar 1000, Bathurst, New South Wales
Mark Skaife put one hand on the championship after his win at Bathurst with Tony Longhurst. the drive of the day went to Brad Jones and John Cleland who started 21st and finished 2nd even despite radio dramas that meant that Cleland didn't come in under safety car. They lost out by a couple of seconds. Todd Kelly and Greg Murphy finished 3rd after running in the top 3 all day. They could have won if Todd didn't spin on a slippy track coming into the last pitstop at the chase. Russell Ingall overtook Jason Bright into 2nd place of the championship when Jason didn't finish with Tomas Mezera. Russell and Larry Perkins led coming into the final pitstop but Larry crashed when coming into the pit lane; damaging the front spoiler. They eventually finished 8th. Pole position man Marcos Ambrose went back though the field until he over cooked it coming into pit land at the first pit stop and got stuck in the gravel. He eventually retired. Greg Ritter and Cameron McLean finished 4th after a great race with a fast car. Paul Radisich and Steven Johnson retired with an engine failure during a safety car.

Boost Mobile V8 International, Pukekohe, New Zealand
In the first ever overseas event for the series, Greg Murphy collected maximum points on home turf. Mark Skaife collects the championship in the first race when he finished ahead of Russell Ingall who had a number of problems with the gearbox. Marcos Ambrose finished 3rd but didn't have the pace of the leading Holdens.

Sandown, Victoria
Todd Kelly wins his first ever championship round after a win in race 2 and other consistent race results. Mark Skaife wins the first race in dry conditions, but struggled in the wet conditions and eventually retired from race 3 after contact with Steven Richards. Craig Lowndes won the 3rd race from Marcos Ambrose.

Overall
Mark Skaife wins the series for the 4th time ahead of Russell Ingall. Jason Bright comes 3rd ahead of Greg Murphy. The first Ford driver is Steven Johnson. Todd Kelly comes 6th after his strong final round ahead of Paul Radisich who had some strong rounds. Marcos Ambrose collected the rookie of the year award after coming 8th but would regret the endurance races where he only collected 112 pts. Steve Ellery is the first driver from a single car team, placing 9th and Garth Tander eventually finishes 10th after a tough year. Craig Lowndes is 11th in his first year for Ford.

References

External links
 Official V8 Supercar website

Supercars Championship seasons
Shell

sv:V8 Supercar 2001